Andrew Graham (born 22 September 1983, Glasgow) is a Scottish professional footballer who plays as a defender for Scottish League One side Alloa Athletic. Graham started his career as a youth with Glasgow Amateurs, before playing for Stirling Albion, Hamilton Academical, Greenock Morton, Dumbarton and Ayr United.

Career

Stirling Albion
Graham joined Stirling Albion from Glasgow Amateurs U-21 squad. His debut for Stirling Albion was on 30 July 2005, against Ayr United and he scored his first senior club goal on 27 August 2005 against Alloa Athletic. He started his career as a central defender but won the Stirling Albion.com Player of the Year award for the 2009–10 season playing at right back.

Hamilton & Morton
After his contract with Stirling Albion expired, Graham joined Hamilton Academical for the 2010–11 season, signing on a one-year contract.

Upon reaching the end of his year-long deal at Accies, Graham signed for the club that he supports – Greenock Morton. After breaking his cheekbone in the Renfrewshire Cup final, Graham made his début as a substitute against Dundee on 27 August 2011.

Dumbarton
After one season at Cappielow, Graham was released and signed for nearby Dumbarton along with teammate Ross Forsyth, where he was made captain He scored his first goal for the club against East Stirlingshire in November 2012. At the end of the 2012–13 season, Graham signed a new one-year contract with Dumbarton. In May 2014 Graham agreed to another new one-year contract. He played in 83 consecutive matches before missing the 3–0 defeat to Hibernian in February 2015 to attend the birth of his daughter, Eilidh.

He made his 100th appearance for the club on the final day of the 2014–15 season in a 2–2 draw with Raith. After winning the club's player of the season accolade he renewed his contract for the 2015–16 season. He was replaced by Darren Barr as club captain in July 2015 and left the club by mutual consent a month later

Ayr United
On 27 August 2015, Graham signed for Ayr United on a one-year contract. He scored the winning penalty in the Scottish Championship play-off final shoot-out against Stranraer. Shortly after this, he was released by Ayr.

Alloa Athletic
On 2 June 2016, Graham joined Scottish League One side Alloa Athletic, to be reunited with coach Jack Ross. He is currently the team captain.

Career statistics

See also
2011–12 Greenock Morton F.C. season

References

External links

Living people
1983 births
Scottish footballers
Association football defenders
Stirling Albion F.C. players
Hamilton Academical F.C. players
Greenock Morton F.C. players
Dumbarton F.C. players
Ayr United F.C. players
Alloa Athletic F.C. players
People from Dunoon
Scottish Premier League players
Scottish Football League players
Scottish Professional Football League players
Footballers from Glasgow
Sportspeople from Argyll and Bute
People educated at Dunoon Grammar School